Czech composer Josef Suk's Second Symphony, named "Asrael" (Czech: „Asrael“, Symfonie pro velký orchestr c moll), was completed in 1906 following the deaths first of his father-in-law, in 1904, and then of his wife. Inevitably mournful but also vital in nature, the five-movement, hour-long work is cast in C minor and scored in Straussian vein for large orchestra. It was published as Opus 27. The composer had married Otilie Dvořáková, daughter of his composition teacher, Antonín Dvořák.

Background 
Suk began to compose his funeral symphony at the beginning of 1905, about eight months after Dvořák's death. The composition was titled after Asrael (Azrael), known as the angel of death in the Old Testament and as the Islamic carrier of souls after death.  The work is in five movements.  Suk completed the sketches of three movements less than a half year later. On 6 July 1905, while Suk was in the middle of the work, his wife Otilie died. Although the composition was to be also a celebration of Dvořák's life and work, the desolated composer rejected the optimistic tone of the rest of the work. Suk himself recalled:

 The fearsome Angel of Death struck with his scythe a second time.  Such a misfortune either destroys a man or brings to the surface all the powers dormant in him. Music saved me and after a year I began the second part of the symphony, beginning with an adagio, a tender portrait of Otilka.

Suk completed the score on 4 October 1906.  He dedicated the work "to the exalted memory of Dvořák and Otilie", in particular the last two movements to Otilie.

The symphony was premièred on 3 February 1907 at the Prague National Theatre, conducted by Karel Kovařovic. Karel Hoffmann and Jiří Herold, members of the Czech Quartet, attended the premiere as the concertmasters of the orchestra of the National Theatre.

Structure 
The composition is in five movements:
 Andante sostenuto
 Andante
 Vivace
 Adagio - a portrait of Suk's wife
 Adagio e maestoso

The influence of Dvořák's composing style, apparent in Suk's previous work, is not noticeable in this composition, according to Vysloužil, who writes that Suk develops his musical language rather toward modern polyphonic and harmonic techniques.  Suk included several music quotations in tribute to his father-in-law and wife, including quotes from Dvořák's Requiem and opera Rusalka.

Instrumentation 
The symphony is scored for piccolo, 2 flutes, 2 oboes, cor anglais, 2 clarinets in B-flat (A, E-flat), bass clarinet, 2 bassoons, contrabassoon, 6 horns (horns V and VI ad lib), 3 trumpets in C, 3 trombones, tuba, timpani, triangle, cymbals, bass drum, harp, and strings.

Recordings
1952 - Czech Phil., Talich, Supraphon
1990 - Royal Liverpool Phil., Pešek, Virgin

Notes

References

External links 
 (Score and Reduction)

Compositions by Josef Suk
Suk
1906 compositions
Compositions in C minor
Antonín Dvořák